St Mary-le-Tower is the civic church of Ipswich and a Grade II* listed building.  It was in the churchyard of St Mary that the town charter of Ipswich was written in 1200.

History

Although medieval, the church mostly dates from 1860 to 1870, when it was rebuilt by Richard Phipson. Rebuilding was funded by George Bacon, banker and philanthropist. St Mary Le Tower is mentioned in the Domesday Book, demonstrating that the site has been occupied by a church since at least 1086.

Memorials

The church contains a brass memorial on a chancel pier to H.A. Douglas-Hamilton, vicar from 1915 to 1925. There are also four brasses in the chancel floor.

Organ

The church has a large three-manual pipe organ, which has its origins in an instrument by Renatus Harris of 1690. There was subsequent work by Henry Willis, Spurden Rutt and Bishop and Son. A specification of the organ can be found on the National Pipe Organ Register.

Bells
Originally there were five bells and a Sanctus in 1553 of which Miles Graye I of Colchester recast the Treble in 1607 and the Tenor in 1610. The church was the first in Suffolk to achieve a tower a peal of 12 bells in 1865. With the addition of a sharp second in 1980, the current bells are all by John Taylor of Loughborough (except for No. 7, which is by Mears & Stainbank of London).

Incumbents

Thomas Peacock 1542
John Somerton 1555
George Webb 1577 - 1606
Nathaniel Roe 1608 - 1614
Mr Nuttall 1615
John Ward 1616 - 1620
John Gooding 1620 - 1624
Samuel Ward 1624 - 1627
Mr Skinner 1628 - 1630
Mr Raymond 1630 - 1632
Samuel Ward 1632 - 1635
John Ashborn 1635 - 1636
Gawen Nash 1637 - 1641
William Fincham 1649 
Mr Chapman ???? - 1662
John Burrough 1662 - 1670
Hugh Roberts 1670 - 1672
Samuel Brunning 1674 - 1677
Samuel Gotty 1677
Joseph Cutlove 1678 - 1707
Dr. Thomas Bishop 1708 - 1737
Thomas Bishop 1737 - 1777
Thomas Cobbold 1778 - 1831, grandson of Thomas Cobbold (1708–1767)
Francis Cobbold 1831 - 1838, succeeded his father
William Nassau St Leger 1838 - 1860
Joames Robert Thurrock 1861 - 1890
Afthil Arthur Barrington 1890 - 1904
William Melville Pigot 1904 - 1914
Hamilton Anne Douglas-Hamilton 1915 - 1925
Arthur William Watson Wallace MA 1925 - 1928
Arthur Herbert Streeten MC MA 1928 - 1942
Richard Hamilton Babington MA 1942 - 1958
Basil Layton Spurgin MA 1958 - 1972
Geoffrey John Tarris MA 1972 - 1982
Keith Brynmor Jones MA 1982 - 1996
Peter Kenneth Townley BA. 1996 - 2008
Charles Alexander Graham Jenkin, BSc 2008 - 2021
Thomas James Mumford 2021 -

See also
List of tallest buildings and structures in Ipswich

References

Church of England church buildings in Ipswich
Grade II* listed buildings in Ipswich